Salomon van Ruysdael (c. 1602, Naarden – buried 3 November 1670, Haarlem) was a Dutch Golden Age landscape painter. He was the uncle of Jacob van Ruisdael.

Biography
According to Arnold Houbraken he was the son of a woodworker who specialized in making fancy ebony frames for mirrors and paintings.  His father sent his sons Jacob and Salomon to learn Latin and medicine, and they both became landscape painters, specializing in ruis-daal, or trickling water through a dale, after their name. Jacob was registered with the Haarlem Guild of St. Luke and signed his paintings, while Salomon signed them much less often and was not a member for several years. Houbraken wrote that Salomon invented a way of creating sculpted ornaments that when they were polished, looked like polished marble. These were quite popular as a decoration on chests and picture frames, until the secret of their manufacture was discovered and widely copied.

Houbraken confused the members of the Ruysdael family. According to the Netherlands Institute for Art History (Dutch abbreviation, RKD), Salomon was the brother of Isaack van Ruisdael, who before they moved to Haarlem, were called Gooyer or Gooier and they were sons of Jacob van Gooyer the Elder, who was a furniture and frame maker in Naarden. Both sons had sons they named after their father. Thus Salomon was the uncle, not the brother of Jacob Isaakszoon van Ruisdael, and he was the father of Jacob Salomonsz van Ruysdael. Salomon joined the Haarlem Guild of St. Luke in 1623 (as Salomon de Gooyer), and he became a follower of Jan Porcellis and Esaias van de Velde. He travelled from Haarlem to Leiden, Utrecht, Amersfoort, Alkmaar, Rhenen, and Dordrecht, painting landscapes and stately homes. Of the four painters, Jacob Isaakszoon is the most famous today.

Works
Salomon was known for his landscapes and river scenes, and there are a few fish still life paintings known.
River Landscape, 1642 (Musée des Beaux-Arts de Strasbourg)
Ferry near Gorinchem, 1646
Ferry Boat with cattle on the River Vecht near Nijenrode, 1649
Ferry on a River, 1649
Drawing the Eel, circa 1650, Metropolitan Museum of Art.
View of Deventer Seen from the North-West, 1657

References

External links
Works and literature on PubHist
Salomon van Ruysdael on Artnet

1600s births
1670 deaths
Dutch Golden Age painters
Dutch male painters
Dutch landscape painters
People from Naarden
Painters from Haarlem
Jacob van Ruisdael